Nila is a 1994 Tamil-language comedy drama film directed by Nambirajan. The film stars Jayaram and Vineetha, with an ensemble supporting cast including Yuvarani, Goundamani, Senthil, Ganthimathi, Vijayakumar, Manjula Vijayakumar and Prakash Raj. It was released on 24 November 1994.

Plot
Ayyanar is a kind-hearted person and a kulfi street vendor. One day, out of pity Ayyanar gives refuge to a girl suffering from amnesia and behaving like a child. Ayyanar and Aatha, who is like his own mother, take care of her. Ayyanar names the girl "Nila". In the meantime, the medical student Subha falls in love with Ayyanar. Living with a woman without getting married is not well seen, so Ayyanar and Nila get married. Afterwards, Ayyanar and Nila live happily, Nila even becomes pregnant. After her delivery, Nila regains her memory and is transferred in a better hospital. There, Nila meets her real family and her fiancé.

The real name of Nila is Ramya. She lived with her parents in Delhi and she was engaged to Ramesh. One day, an earthquake struck in Delhi and they were all separated, her family thought that she was dead.

When Ayyanar comes to see his wife, Nila in the first place rejects him but she then decides to live as "Nila" with Ayyanar and their newborn baby. What transpires next forms the rest of the story.

Cast

Jayaram as Ayyanar
Vineetha as Nila / Ramya
Yuvarani as Subha
Goundamani
Senthil as Dinku
Ganthimathi as Aatha
Vijayakumar as Vijay, Ramya's father
Manjula Vijayakumar as Lakshmi, Ramya's mother
Prakash Raj as Ramesh
Jai Ganesh as Subha's father
Idichapuli Selvaraj as Munusamy
Karikalan as Vadivelu
Ponnambalam
LIC Narasimhan
Loose Mohan
Bonda Mani
M. R. Krishnamurthy
Krishnamoorthy
Sanjay
Pasi Narayanan
Thideer Kannaiah
Thayir Vadai Desigan
Vellai Subbaiah
Bayilvan Ranganathan
Velmurugan
Ramakrishna Iyer
Sahadevan
Mahadevan
Kavithasri
Pasi Sathya

Soundtrack

The soundtrack was composed by Deva, with lyrics written by Vaali.

Critical reception
On 25 November 1994, Malini Mannath, writing for The Indian Express, called it an extended version of Moondram Pirai, adding, "the director has managed to keep proceedings interesting".

References

External links 
 

1994 films
1990s Tamil-language films
Indian romance films
Films scored by Deva (composer)
1990s romance films